Avron B. Fogelman Arena in Devlin Fieldhouse is a 4,100-seat, multi-purpose arena built in 1933 on Tulane University's Uptown campus in New Orleans, Louisiana. Since its opening, it has been home to the Tulane Green Wave men's and women's basketball teams and the women's volleyball team. Devlin is the 9th-oldest continuously active basketball venue in the nation.

Tulane Gym and Fogelman Arena eras
Construction of Tulane Gym began in 1931 with funds earned from the football team's appearance in the 1932 Rose Bowl, and as a result it was known for many years around campus as "Rose Bowl Gym." The gym was the site of the 1942 NCAA basketball tournament East Regional games, won by the Dartmouth Indians. The Tulane Boxing team held matches in the gymnasium. During World War II, the building housed V-12 students, and in 1975 it was the site of President Gerald Ford's speech announcing the end of US involvement in the Vietnam War. 

In 1969 and 1970, the gym was home to the New Orleans Buccaneers of the American Basketball Association. 

In 1988 the university embarked on the first extensive remodel and refurbishment of the 55-year-old structure, timed to coincide with the return of the men's basketball program from its four-season dormancy in the wake of a point shaving scandal involving future NBA player John "Hot Rod" Williams. In 1989, the remodeled building was renamed "Avron B. Fogelman Arena" in honor of Memphis businessman and Tulane alumnus Avron Fogelman, whose donations funded the project. Fogelman Arena played host to the Conference USA women's basketball tournament in 1999 and 2009. In 2008 Barack Obama spoke to a capacity crowd in Fogelman as part of his campaign for the Democratic nomination for president.

Devlin Fieldhouse era
 Immediately after the 2011–12 basketball season, Tulane embarked on a major, two-phase renovation of the arena with funds provided by longtime supporters Bob and Kate Devlin, whose names were added to the arena. Phase one, including new lighting, ticket booths, chair-back seats, concrete supports, contoured bench seating, concessions, team shop, and club areas, was completed in time for the 2012–13 basketball season. The acoustical ceiling was removed to reveal the original red wood ceiling and steel structure. The newly renovated Fieldhouse opened on November 9, 2012, with a women's basketball game versus the Louisiana Tech Lady Techsters, a 66–59 victory for the Green Wave. Phase two was completed prior to the 2014 volleyball season. It increased the number of restrooms and rebuilt the visitor locker rooms, officials' locker room, and laundry facility. Work continued in 2015 with the installation of new energy-efficient windows and painting and other minor upgrades.

Gallery

See also
List of NCAA Division I basketball arenas

References

Tulane Green Wave men's basketball
Tulane Green Wave women's basketball
Tulane Green Wave women's volleyball
Tulane Green Wave basketball venues
Tulane Green Wave sports venues
New Orleans Buccaneers venues
American Basketball Association venues
Basketball venues in New Orleans
Boxing venues in New Orleans
College basketball venues in the United States
College volleyball venues in the United States
Indoor arenas in New Orleans
Indoor arenas in Louisiana
NCAA Division I men's basketball tournament Final Four venues
Volleyball venues in New Orleans